St Nicholas' Church is the parish church of Askham Bryan, near York in England, and is a Grade I listed building.

The church was constructed in the 12th-century, while the parish was in the possession of William de Tykhill.  It is in the Norman style, constructed with a mixture of limestone ashlar, sandstone rubble, and some reused Roman bricks.  The nave and chancel form a single space, while there is a porch to the south, and a vestry to the north.  There is a single round-arched window at the west end, and three smaller similar windows in each of the north and south walls, and also in the east end, which has a round window above.

The roof is tiled, with a belfry on top, added in 1611, and a cross atop that.  The porch has a triple round-headed archway, with zig-zag and small leaf mouldings.  Inside there is a Jacobean pulpit and communion rail.

References

Askham Bryan
Askham Bryan